A bass (/beɪs/) musical instrument produces tones in the low-pitched range C4- C2. Basses belong to different families of instruments and can cover a wide range of musical roles. Since producing low pitches usually requires a long air column or string, the string and wind bass instruments are usually the largest instruments in their families or instrument classes.

As seen in the musical instrument classification article, categorizing instruments can be difficult. For example, some instruments fall into more than one category. The cello is considered a tenor instrument in some orchestral settings, but in a string quartet it is the bass instrument.

Examples grouped by general form and playing technique include:
 Plucked string instruments, primary bass guitar and to a lesser extent acoustic bass guitar and even less often, folk instruments like contrabass guitar, guitarrón mexicano, tololoche, bass banjo or bass balalaika, instruments shaped, constructed and held (or worn) like guitars, that play in the bass range. The electric bass guitar is usually the instrument referred to as a "bass" in pop and rock music. The electric bass guitar, while invented in the 1930s by Paul Tutmarc, was first mass-produced by Leo Fender in 1951 and quickly replaced the more unwieldy double bass among non-classical musicians.
 Bowed string instruments, primary double bass (usually the instrument referred to as a "bass" in European classical music and jazz, sometimes called a "string bass" to differentiate it from a "brass bass" or "bass horn", or an "upright bass" to differentiate it from a "bass guitar") and to a lesser extent cello from the viol or violin family and violone from viola da gamba family. It was first developed in 16th century Europe. While being bowed instruments, they can be played pizzicato, which is a standard double bass technique in jazz, blues and rockabilly.
A bass singer has the lowest vocal range of all voice types, typically a range extending from around the second E below middle C to the E above middle C (i.e., E2–E4).
A bass horn, such as a tuba, serpent, and sousaphone from the wind family and low-tuned versions of specific types of brass and woodwind instruments, such as bassoon, bass clarinet, bass trombone and bass saxophone, etc. (less common usage). The serpent was invented around the end of the 15th century, with lower instruments, such as the bass-tuba appearing over subsequent centuries.
Keyboard bass, a keyboard alternative to the bass guitar or double bass (e.g. the Fender Rhodes piano bass in the 1960s or 13-note MIDI keyboard controllers in the 2000s). This instrument peaked in popularity during the late 1970s and early 1980s, being particularly associated with the synth pop genre.
Bass pedalboard, a keyboard operated by feet found at the base of the console of most pipe organs, pedal pianos, theatre organs, and electric organs.
Washtub bass, a simple folk instrument. Also known as a "gutbucket", it is generally believed to have derived from the African ground bow.

A musician playing one of these instruments is often known as a bassist. Other more specific terms such as 'bass guitarist', 'double bassist', 'bass player', etc. may also be used.

Further reading

References 

Contrabass instruments
Bass (sound)